Mouphtaou Monra Yarou (born June 26, 1990) is a Beninese professional basketball player who last played for ESSM Le Portel of the LNB Pro A. He played at the collegiate level for the Villanova University Wildcats.

College career
Yarou averaged 8.4 points and 7.1 rebounds per game as a sophomore at Villanova. As a junior, Yarou averaged 11.3 points and 8.2 rebounds per game as Villanova finished 13-19 and missed the NCAA Tournament for the first time since 2004. Yarou averaged 9.9 points and 7.8 rebounds per game for the Wildcats as a senior.

Professional career 
In August 2013, he signed a one-year deal with Radnički Kragujevac of Serbia. In nine games, he averaged 11.9 points and 10.6 rebounds per game. On November 30, he was suspended for serious violations of disciplinary regulations and contract obligations.   

On June 6, 2014, he signed a two-year deal with Le Mans Sarthe Basket of the LNB Pro A.

In July 2016, Yarou joined the Boston Celtics for the 2016 NBA Summer League. On July 22, 2016, he re-signed with Le Mans for one more season.

On September 1, 2017, Yarou signed with Antibes Sharks for the 2017–18 Pro A season.

On June 6, 2018, Yarou signed with Levallois Metropolitans.

On May 25, 2020, he has signed with Boulazac Basket Dordogne of the LNB Pro A. Yarou averaged 13.9 points, 8.3 rebounds, and 1.3 assists per game. On October 6, 2021, he signed with Nanterre 92. Yarou parted ways with the team on October 30, after averaging 6.3 points and 4.3 rebounds per game.

On November 2, he signed with ESSM Le Portel.

See also 
 List of foreign basketball players in Serbia

References

External links
 Villanova Wildcats bio
 Draftexpress.com profile 
 LNB Pro A profile 

1990 births
Living people
Beninese expatriate basketball people in France
Beninese expatriate basketball people in Serbia
Beninese expatriate basketball people in the United States
Beninese men's basketball players
Boulazac Basket Dordogne players
Centers (basketball)
ESSM Le Portel players
KK Radnički Kragujevac (2009–2014) players
Le Mans Sarthe Basket players
Metropolitans 92 players
Nanterre 92 players
Olympique Antibes basketball players
People from Atakora Department
Villanova Wildcats men's basketball players